173P/Mueller, also known as Mueller 5, is a periodic comet in the Solar System.

References

External links 
 Orbital simulation from JPL (Java) / Horizons Ephemeris
 173P on Seiichi Yoshida's comet list

Periodic comets
0173
173P